England women's cricket team toured Sri Lanka in November 2016. The tour consisted of a series of four One Day Internationals, in which the final three were part of the 2014–16 ICC Women's Championship. England women won the series 4–0.

Squads

ODI series

1st ODI

2nd ODI

3rd ODI

4th ODI

References

External links
 Series home at ESPN Cricinfo

International cricket competitions in 2016–17
2014–16 ICC Women's Championship
Women's international cricket tours of Sri Lanka
Sri Lanka 2016
2016 in English women's cricket
2016 in Sri Lankan cricket
2016 in women's cricket